Sydney Matilda Lohmann (born 19 June 2000) is a German footballer who plays as a midfielder for Frauen-Bundesliga club Bayern Munich and the Germany national team.

Club career
In November 2020, Lohmann extended her contract with FC Bayern Munich through 2024.

International career
She was a youth international for Germany on several selection levels before making her senior team debut in 2018.

Lohmann was named in the Germany squad for UEFA Women's Euro 2022 and came on late in the final.

Career statistics

Scores and results list Germany's goal tally first, score column indicates score after each Lohmann goal.

Honours
FC Bayern Munich
Frauen-Bundesliga: 2020-21
Germany

 UEFA Women's Championship runner-up: 2022
Germany U17
UEFA Women's Under-17 Championship: 2016, 2017

References

External links
Sydney Lohmann at Soccerdonna.de
Sydney Lohmann at Fupa.net

2000 births
Living people
German women's footballers
FC Bayern Munich (women) players
Women's association football midfielders
Frauen-Bundesliga players
Footballers from Bavaria
Germany women's international footballers
UEFA Women's Euro 2022 players